Empress Dowager Cao (曹太后) may refer to:

Empress Dowager Cao (Li Cunxu's mother) (died 925), empress dowager of Later Tang during the reign of Li Cunxu
Empress Cao (Li Siyuan's wife) (died 937), empress dowager of Later Tang during the reigns of Li Conghou and Li Congke
Empress Cao (Song dynasty) (1016–1079), empress consort and empress dowager of the Song dynasty

See also
Empress Cao (disambiguation)

Cao